Yucatec Maya (referred to by its speakers simply as Maya or as  ) is one of the 33 Mayan languages of the Mayan language family. Yucatec Maya is spoken in the Yucatán Peninsula and northern Belize. There is also a significant diasporic community of Yucatec Maya speakers in San Francisco, though most Mayan Americans are speakers of other Mayan languages from Guatemala and Chiapas.

Etymology 

According to the Hocabá dictionary, compiled by American anthropologist Victoria Bricker, there is a variant name  , literally "flat speech"). A popular, yet false, alternative etymology of Mayab is "ma ya'ab" or "not many," "the few" which derives from New Age spiritualist interpretations of the Maya. The use of "Mayab" as the name of the language seems to be unique to the town of Hocabá, as indicated by the Hocabá dictionary and is not employed elsewhere in the region or in Mexico, by either Spanish or Maya speakers. As used in Hocabá, "Mayab" is not the recognized name of the language, but instead a "nickname" derived from a common nickname for the region, the Mayab ("Mayab, the land of pheasant and deer"), the use of which emerged in the colonial period. This use may also derive from the title of a self-published book by a Yucatec scholar, Santiago Pacheco Cruz (1969). The meaning and origins of "Maya" as the name of the language (versus Mayab) and as the ethnic identity (ethnonym) are complex questions (see etymology and social history of the word as ethnic identity and name of the language in Restall (2004) and Restall and Gabbert (2017).

Linguists have added Yucatec to the name in order to clearly distinguish it from the rest of Mayan languages (such as Kʼicheʼ and Itzaʼ). Thus the use of the term Yucatec Maya to refer to the language is scholarly or scientific nomenclature. Native speakers do not qualify the language as Yucatec, calling it "Maaya," "maayaʼ tʼàan," or "maasewal t'aan" (commoner language) in their language and simply (el) maya when speaking Spanish.

In the Mexican states of Yucatán, some parts of Campeche, Tabasco, Chiapas, and Quintana Roo, Yucatec Maya is still the mother tongue of a large segment of the population in the early 21st century. It has approximately 800,000 speakers in this region. There were an additional 2,518 speakers of Yucatec Maya in Belize as of the 2010 national census.

Recently, scholars in the fields of history and anthropology have raised ethical and political questions about the continued use of the label "Yucatec Maya" to the language that is known and named by native speakers as simply "Maya" (see Castañeda (2021), Castillo Cocom (2021), Hernandez Reyna and Castillo Cocom (2021), Restall (2004), Restall and Gabbert (2017). These scholars argue, both explicitly and implicitly, that the use of "Yucatec Maya" manifests a continuation and propagation of neocolonial relationships, specifically the scientific imperialism of linguistics and the cultural hegemony of anglophone academia. The term "Yucatec Maya" was invented in the early-mid 20th century by linguists so as to not confuse themselves with the use of word "Maya" (the actual name of the language) when this was used to reference the source language of all the Mayan languages; this source language is now no longer called "Proto-Maya" but is instead called Proto-Mayan. The designation "Yucatec Maya" has been understood by generations of US scholars to refer to the Yucatan Peninsula. However, "Yucateco" amongst Mexicans, especially non-academics, has always primarily referenced the state of Yucatan (located in the northwestern corner of the Peninsula with the same name) and, in particular, the ethnic-national identity and culture of this state. Thus, Maya linguists from Quintana Roo, for example Jaime Chi and Edber Dzidz Yam, have identified that the term actually introduces confusion, given that in common understanding among Mexicans the name Maya refers to the peoples and language living throughout the Peninsula while the phrase "Yucatec Maya" would seem to denote a dialect of the Maya language that is spoken in the state of Yucatan, Mexico, in contrast to other regional dialects of Maya such as spoken in the states of Quintana Roo, or Campeche and in northern Belize. Thus, the above scholars argue, to continue to use the phrase "Yucatec Maya" to refer to either the people or the language instead of the proper name, that is, Maya, used by the speakers of this language would be an injustice. On the new politics of using Maya and not Mayan as an ethnic label see:

History 

Yucatec Maya forms part of the Yucatecan branch of the Mayan language family. The Yucatecan branch is divided by linguists into the subgroups Mopan-itza and Yucatec-Lacandon. These are made up by four languages: 
Itza, 
Mopan, 
Yucatec Maya
Lacandon.

All the languages in the Mayan language family are thought to originate from an ancestral language that was spoken some 5,000 years ago, known as Proto-Mayan.

The Maya had been in a stable decline when Spanish conquistadors arrived in 1517 AD. From 200 to 800 AD the Maya were thriving and making great technological advances. They created a system for recording numerals and hieroglyphs that was more complex and efficient than what had come before. They migrated northward and eastward to the Yucatán peninsula from Palenque, Jaina, and Bonampak. In the 12th and 13th centuries, a coalition emerged in the Yucatán peninsula among three important centers, Uxmal, Chichen Itza, and Mayapan. The society grew and the people were able to practice intellectual and artistic achievement during a period of peace. When war broke out, such progress was stalled. By the 15th century, Mayan Toltec collapsed and was abandoned.

The Genoese explorer Christopher Columbus traded with Maya merchants off the coast of Yucatán during his expedition for the Spanish Crown in 1502, but he never made landfall. During the decade following Columbus's first contact with the Maya, the first Spaniards to set foot on Yucatán soil did so by chance, as survivors of a shipwreck in the Caribbean. The Maya ritually sacrificed most of these men, leaving just two survivors, Gerónimo de Aguilar and Gonzalo Guerrero, who somehow rejoined other Spaniards.

In 1519, Aguilar accompanied Hernán Cortés to the Yucatán island of Cozumel, and also took part in the conquest of central Mexico. Guerrero became a Mexican legend as father of the first Mestizo: by Aguilar's account, Guerrero "went native". He married native women, wore traditional native apparel, and fought against the Spanish.

Francisco de Montejo's military incursion of Yucatán took three generations and three wars with extended fighting, which lasted a total of 24 years.

As the Spanish colonists settled more areas, in the 18th century they developed the lands for large maize plantations and cattle farms. The elite lived in haciendas and exported natural resources as commodities. The Maya were subjects of the Spanish Empire from 1542 to 1821.

During the colonization of the Yucatán peninsula, the Spanish believed that in order to evangelize and govern the Maya, they needed to reform Yucatec Maya. They wanted to shape it to serve their ends of religious conversion and social control.

Spanish religious missionaries undertook a project of linguistic and social transformation known as reducción (from Spanish reducir).  The missionaries translated Catholic Christian religious texts from Spanish into Yucatec Maya and created neologisms to express Catholic religious concepts. The result of this process of reducción was Maya reducido, a semantically transformed version of Yucatec Maya. Missionaries attempted to end Maya religious practices and destroy associated written works. By their translations, they also shaped a language that was used to convert, subjugate, and govern the Maya population of the Yucatán peninsula. But Maya speakers appropriated Maya reducido for their own purposes, resisting colonial domination. The oldest written records in Maya reducido (which used the Roman alphabet) were written by Maya notaries between 1557 and 1851. These works can now be found in the United States, Mexico, and Spain in libraries and archives.

Phonology
A characteristic feature of Yucatec Maya, like other Mayan languages, is the use of ejective consonants: . Often referred to as glottalized consonants, they are produced at the same place of oral articulation as their non-ejective stop counterparts: . However, the release of the lingual closure is preceded by a raising of the closed glottis to increase the air pressure in the space between the glottis and the point of closure, resulting in a release with a characteristic popping sound. The sounds are written using an apostrophe after the letter to distinguish them from the plain consonants (tʼàan "speech" vs. táan "forehead"). The apostrophes indicating the sounds were not common in written Maya until the 20th century but are now becoming more common. The Mayan b is also glottalized, an implosive , and is sometimes written bʼ, but that is becoming less common.

Yucatec Maya is one of only three Mayan languages to have developed tone, the others being Uspantek and one dialect of Tzotzil. Yucatec distinguishes short vowels and long vowels, indicated by single versus double letters (ii ee aa oo uu), and between high- and low-tone long vowels. High-tone vowels begin on a high pitch and fall in phrase-final position but rise elsewhere, sometimes without much vowel length. It is indicated in writing by an acute accent (íi ée áa óo úu). Low-tone vowels begin on a low pitch and are sustained in length; they are sometimes indicated in writing by a grave accent (ìi èe àa òo ùu).

Also, Yucatec has contrastive laryngealization (creaky voice) on long vowels, sometimes realized by means of a full intervocalic glottal stop and written as a long vowel with an apostrophe in the middle, as in the plural suffix -oʼob.

Consonants

Some sources describe the plain consonants as aspirated, but Victoria Bricker states "[s]tops that are not glottalized are articulated with lung air without aspiration as in English spill, skill, still."

Vowels
In terms of vowel quality, Yucatec Maya has a straightforward five vowel system:

For each of these five vowel qualities, the language contrasts four distinct vowel "shapes", i.e. combinations of vowel length, tone, and phonation. In the standard orthography first adopted in 1984, vowel length is indicated by digraphs (e.g. "aa" for IPA ).

In fast-paced speech, the glottalized long vowels may be pronounced the same as the plain long high vowels, so in such contexts ka’an  'sky' sounds the same as káan  'when?'.

Stress
Mayan words are typically stressed on the earliest syllable with a long vowel. If there is no long vowel, then the last syllable is stressed. Borrowings from other languages such as Spanish or Nahuatl are often stressed as in the original languages.

Debuccalization
An important morphophonological process in Yucatec Maya is the dissimilation of identical consonants next to each other by debuccalizing to avoid geminate consonants. If a word ends in one of the glottalized plosives /pʼ tʼ kʼ ɓ/ and is followed by an identical consonant, the final consonant may dispose of its point of articulation and become the glottal stop /ʔ/. This may also happen before another plosive inside a common idiomatic phrase or compound word. Examples:  ~  'Yucatec Maya' (literally, "flat speech"), and náak’-  (a prefix meaning 'nearby') + káan  'sky' gives  'palate, roof the mouth' (so literally "nearby-sky").

Meanwhile, if the final consonant is one of the other consonants, it debuccalizes to /h/: nak  'to stop sth' + -kúuns  (a causative suffix) gives nahkúuns  'to support sb/sth' (cf. the homophones nah, possessed form nahil, 'house'; and nah, possessed form nah, 'obligation'), náach’  'far' + -chah  (an inchoative suffix) gives náahchah  'to become distant'.

This change in the final consonant is often reflected in orthographies, so  can appear as maya’ t’àan, maya t'aan, etc.

Acquisition
Phonology acquisition is received idiosyncratically. If a child seems to have severe difficulties with affricates and sibilants, another might have no difficulties with them while having significant problems with sensitivity to semantic content, unlike the former child.

There seems to be no incremental development in phonology patterns. Monolingual children learning the language have shown acquisition of aspiration and deobstruentization but difficulty with sibilants and affricates, and other children show the reverse. Also, some children have been observed fronting palatoalveolars, others retract lamino-alveolars, and still others retract both.

Glottalization was not found to be any more difficult than aspiration. That is significant with the Yucatec Mayan use of ejectives. Glottal constriction is high in the developmental hierarchy, and features like [fricative], [apical], or [fortis] are found to be later acquired.

Grammar
Like almost all Mayan languages, Yucatec Maya is verb-initial. Word order varies between VOS and VSO, with VOS being the most common. Many sentences may appear to be SVO, but this order is due to a topic–comment system similar to that of Japanese. One of the most widely studied areas of Yucatec is the semantics of time in the language. Yucatec, like many other languages of the world (Chinese, Kalaallisut, arguably Guaraní and others) does not have the grammatical category of tense. Temporal information is encoded by a combination of aspect, inherent lexical aspect (aktionsart), and pragmatically governed conversational inferences. Yucatec is unusual in lacking temporal connectives such as 'before' and 'after'. Another aspect of the language is the core-argument marking strategy, which is a 'fluid S system' in the typology of Dixon (1994) where intransitive subjects are encoded like agents or patients based upon a number of semantic properties as well as the perfectivity of the event.

Verb paradigm

Orthography
The Maya were literate in pre-Columbian times, when the language was written using Maya script. The language itself can be traced back to proto-Yucatecan, the ancestor of modern Yucatec Maya, Itza, Lacandon and Mopan. Even further back, the language is ultimately related to all other Maya languages through proto-Mayan itself.

Yucatec Maya is now written in the Latin script. This was introduced during the Spanish Conquest of Yucatán which began in the early 16th century, and the now-antiquated conventions of Spanish orthography of that period ("Colonial orthography") were adapted to transcribe Yucatec Maya. This included the use of x for the postalveolar fricative sound (which is often written in English as sh), a sound that in Spanish has since turned into a velar fricative nowadays spelled j.

Examples

Use in modern media and popular culture

Yucatec-language programming is carried by the CDI's radio stations XEXPUJ-AM (Xpujil, Campeche), XENKA-AM (Felipe Carrillo Puerto, Quintana Roo) and XEPET-AM (Peto, Yucatán).

The 2006 film Apocalypto, directed by Mel Gibson, was filmed entirely in Yucatec Maya. The script was translated into Maya by Hilario Chi Canul of the Maya community of Felipe Carrillo Puerto, who also worked as a language coach on the production.

In the video game Civilization V: Gods & Kings, Pacal, leader of the Maya, speaks in Yucatec Maya.

In August 2012, the Mozilla Translathon 2012 event brought over 20 Yucatec Mayan speakers together in a localization effort for the Google Endangered Languages Project, the Mozilla browser, and the MediaWiki software used by Wikipedia and other Wikimedia projects.

Baktun, the "first ever Mayan telenovela,"  premiered in August 2013.

Jesús Pat Chablé is often credited with being one of the first Maya-language rappers and producers.

In the 2018 video game Shadow of the Tomb Raider, the inhabitants of the game's Paititi region speak in Yucatec Maya (while immersion mode is on).

The modern bible edition, the New World Translation of the Holy Scriptures was released in the Maya language in 2019. It's distributed without charge, both printed and online editions.

On December 4, 2019, the Congress of Yucatán unanimously approved a measure requiring the teaching of the Maya language in schools in the state.

Yucatec Maya is spoken by the fictional underwater kingdom of Talokan and its king Kukulkan in the 2022 film Black Panther: Wakanda Forever.

See also
Yucatec Maya Sign Language

References

Sources

Further reading
 Chamberlain, Robert S. The Conquest and Colonization of Yucatan, 1517-1550. Washington: Carnegie Institute, 1948.
 Clendinnen, Inga. Ambivalent Conquests: Maya and Spaniard in Yucatan, 1517–1570, Sec. ed. New York: Cambridge University Press, 2003.
 Clendinnen, Inga. "Landscape and World View: The Survival of Yucatec Maya Culture Under Spanish Conquest," Comparative Studies in Society and History, Vol. 22, No. 3 (Cambridge University Press, 1980), 374–393.
 Díaz del Castillo, Bernal. The History of the Conquest of New Spain. Albuquerque: University of New Mexico Press, 2008. Ed. and Trans. David Carrasco.
 Farriss, Nancy M. Maya Society Under Colonial Rule: The Collective Enterprise of Survival. Princeton: Princeton University Press, 1984.
 Farriss, Nancy M. "Sacred Power in Colonial Mexico: The Case of Sixteenth Century Yucatan," The Meeting of Two Worlds: Europe and the Americas 1492–1650, Warwick Bray, Ed. New York: Oxford University Press, 1993.
 Garcia Bernal, Manuela Cristina. La Sociedad de Yucatán, 1700–1750. Seville: Escuela Estudios Hispano-Americanos, 1972.
 Gibson, Charles. The Aztecs Under Spanish Rule: A History of the Indians of the Valley of Mexico, 1519–1810. Stanford: Stanford University Press, 1964.
 Hanks, William F. "Authenticity and Ambivalence in the Text: A Colonial Maya Case," American Ethnologist Vol. 13, No. 4 (Blackwell, 1986), 721–744.
 Hunt, Martha Espejo-Ponce. "Colonial Yucatan: Town and Region in the Seventeenth Century," Ph.D. Dissertation, Department of History, University of California, Los Angeles, 1974.
 Jones, Grant D. Maya Resistance to Colonial Rule: Time and History on a Colonial Frontier. Albuquerque: University of New Mexico Press, 1989.
 Landa, friar Diego de. Yucatan: Before and After the Conquest. New York: Dover, 1978. Ed. and Trans. William Gates.
 Las Casas, Bartolomé de. In Defense of the Indians. Dekalb: Northern Illinois University Press, 1992. Trans. Stafford Poole.
 Lockhart, James. The Nahuas After the Conquest: A Social and Cultural History of the Indians of Central Mexico, Sixteenth Through Eighteenth Centuries. Stanford: Stanford University Press, 1992.
 Lockhart, James, Ed. and Trans. We People Here: Nahuatl Accounts of the Conquest of Mexico, Vol. 1. Eugene, Oregon: Wipf and Stock, 1993.
 Restall, Matthew. The Black Middle: Africans, Mayas, and Spaniards in Colonial Yucatan. Stanford: Stanford University Press, 2009.
 Restall, Matthew. "A History of the New Philology and the New Philology in History," Latin American Research Review, Vol. 38, No. 1 (Austin: University of Texas Press, 2003), 113–134.
 Restall, Matthew. "Intercultural and Indigenous Testaments," Dead Giveaways: Indigenous Testaments of Colonial Mesoamerica and the Andes, Susan Kellogg and Matthew Restall, Eds. Salt Lake City: University of Utah Press, 1998.
 Restall, Matthew. Maya Conquistador. Boston: Beacon Press, 1998.
 Restall, Matthew. The Maya World: Yucatec Culture and Society, 1550–1850. Stanford: Stanford University Press, 1997.
 Restall, Matthew, Lisa Sousa, and Kevin Terraciano, Eds. Mesoamerican Voices: Native Language Writings from Colonial Mexico, Oaxaca, Yucatan, and Guatemala. New York: Cambridge University Press, 2005.
 Restall, Matthew and John F. Chuchiak IV. "A Reevaluation of the Authenticity of Fray Diego de Landa's Relación de las cosas de Yucatán" Ethnohistory: Journal of the American Society for Ethnohistory, Vol. 49, No. 3 (2002), 651–670.
 Restall, Matthew. Seven Myths of the Spanish Conquistadors. New York: Oxford University Press, 2003.
 Ricard, Robert. The Spiritual Conquest of Mexico: An Essay on the Apostolate and the Evangelizing Methods of the Mendicant Orders in New Spain, 1523–1572. Berkeley: University of California Press, 1966. Trans. Lesley Byrd Simpson.
 Scholes, France V. and Ralph L. Roys. "Fray Diego de Landa and the Problem of Idolatry in the Yucatan," Cooperation in Research. Washington: Carnegie Institution, 1938.
 Scholes, France V. and Ralph L. Roys. The Maya Chontal Indians of Acalan-Tixchel: A Contribution to the History and Ethnography of the Yucatan Peninsula, Sec. ed. Norman: University of Oklahoma Press, 1968.
 Sharer, Robert J. and Loa P. Traxler. The Ancient Maya, Sixth ed. Stanford: Stanford University Press, 2006.
 Thompson, J. Eric S. Maya Hieroglyphic Writing: Introduction. Washington: Carnegie Institution, 1950.
 Trouillot, Michel-Rolph. Silencing the Past: Power and the Production of History. Boston: Beacon Press, 1995.
 Vogt, Evon Z. "The Maintenance of Maya Distinctiveness," The Indian in Latin American History: Resistance, Resilience, and Acculturation, John E. Kizca, Ed. Wilmington, Delaware: Scholarly Resources, 1993.

External links

 Yucatec Maya Collection of William Blunk-Fernández and Michael Carrasco at the Archive of the Indigenous Languages of Latin America. Contains six audio recordings totaling 1.5 hours of spoken Yucatec Maya.
 Mesospace Collection of Juergen Bohnemeyer at the Archive of the Indigenous Languages of Latin America. Contains 19 video recordings. Content restricted, but may be available for researcher use. 
 Mayan Languages Collection of Victoria Bricker at the Archive of the Indigenous Languages of Latin America. Contains 714 archival files, including audio recordings and transcriptions, from the languages Chʼol, Tzotzil, and Yucatec Maya. The recordings include "(1) histories of the Caste War of Yucatan of 1847–1901 and local manifestations of the Mexican Revolution of 1917–1921; (2) legends; (3) astronomical lore; (4) medical lore; (5) autobiographies; (6) conversations; (7) and songs (both traditional and original) from a number of different towns in the peninsula." 
 Yucatec Maya Collection of Melissa Frazier at the Archive of the Indigenous Languages of Latin America. Contains 60 audio recordings of narratives, collected "to establish a collection of spoken Yucatec Maya that will be helpful to anyone who studies the language."
 Yucatec Maya DoReCo corpus compiled by Stavros Skopeteas. Audio recordings of narrative texts, with transcriptions time-aligned at the phone level and translations.

Language courses
In addition to universities and private institutions in Mexico, (Yucatec) Maya is also taught at: 
OSEA – The Open School of Ethnography and Anthropology
The University of Chicago
Leiden University, Netherlands
Harvard University
Tulane University
Indiana University (Minority Languages & Culture Program)
University of Wisconsin–Madison
The University of North Carolina
INALCO, Paris, France

Free online dictionary, grammar and texts:
FAMSI © 2001: David Bolles
University of Quintana Roo, 2009 (pdf)

 
Agglutinative languages
Mayan languages
Indigenous languages of Mexico
Indigenous languages of Central America
Languages of Belize
Corozal District
Orange Walk District
Verb–object–subject languages
Tonal languages